Andover railway station serves the town of Andover, Hampshire, England. The station is served and operated by South Western Railway.

According to the Office of Rail Regulation statistics on rail trends for the year 2019-20, 1,152,576 exits and entries were made at Andover rail station, making it the 15th most used rail station in the county of Hampshire (including the unitary authority areas of Portsmouth City Council and Southampton City Council).

History

The station was opened on 3 July 1854 and was previously known as Andover Junction, as it stood at the junction of the Exeter-London line and the now-defunct Midland and South Western Junction Railway running between Cheltenham, Swindon, Andover and Southampton Terminus. Andover had a second station, Andover Town, to the south of the junction station on the line to Redbridge that was often called the Sprat and Winkle Line.  This route fell victim to the Beeching Axe in September 1964, three years after passenger trains had been withdrawn from the M&SWJR line.

Opened by the London and South Western Railway (LSWR), it became part of the Southern Railway during the Grouping of 1923. The station then passed on to the Southern Region of British Railways on nationalisation in 1948.

When sectorisation was introduced in the 1980s, the station was served by Network SouthEast until the privatisation of British Rail.

Motive Power Depots
The LSWR opened a small locomotive depot a short distance past the junction in 1854, which was damaged in 1856 by a locomotive boiler explosion. The Swindon Marlborough and Andover Railway (SM&AR) also built a depot next to the station in 1882. The LSWR depot was destroyed by fire in 1896 and was replaced by a larger depot next to the SM&AR shed in 1903. The SM&AR was closed by the Western Region of British Railways in 1958 and demolished soon afterwards. The LSWR depot was in the Southern Region and survived until June 1962.

Services

Layout
The entrances are on the south side of the station, which consists of a ticket office, a heated waiting room, three self-service ticket machines, a small counter selling hot drinks outside the station, a bike locker, and a small shop. There are four entrances – one to the east of the ticket office, used when it is closed; the ticket office itself; an entrance to the west of the ticket office that was formerly used for a drinks van (now relocated to the counter outside the station); and one from the car park. This side of the station is platform 2, with trains going west to Salisbury and Exeter St Davids.

Through a step-free subway immediately adjacent to the third entrance as listed above is platform 1, an island platform, which has trains going east to Basingstoke and London. Platform 1 has a waiting room, toilets and a passenger assistance office.

There are two disused platforms. The first is a bay platform on the east side of platform 2, which used to serve as the platform to Redbridge on the Sprat and Winkle Line until the line was closed. The trackbed is still clearly visible, but the track itself has been removed. The second is on the other side of the island to platform 1, which used to serve as the platform to Swindon on the Midland and South Western Junction Railway. This platform still has track, as it is still used for military purposes to link with the depot in Ludgershall. Beyond this are disused sidings.

Future
The new open-access operator Go! Cooperative has proposed operating a light rail service from Andover using the branch line to Ludgershall.

References

 *Body, G. (1984), PSL Field Guides – Railways of the Southern Region, Patrick Stephens Ltd, Cambridge, 
 
 
 Station on navigable O.S. map. Station is northerly one near hospital.

Railway stations in Hampshire
Andover, Hampshire
Railway stations in Great Britain opened in 1854
Former London and South Western Railway stations
Railway stations served by South Western Railway
1854 establishments in England
DfT Category C1 stations